Freedom Is a State of Mind is the debut full-length studio album by American nu metal/rap rock band Corporate Avenger. It consists of songs from the band's previous releases, Taxes Are Stealing and The New Testament, in addition to several new songs that evolved the band's sound and message. It was released on July 10, 2001, via Suburban Noize Records/Koch Records.

Track listing 

Note
 The song "Christians Murdered Indians" includes a spoken word section referencing Bartolomé de las Casas' work A Short Account of the Destruction of the Indies, in the section "Of the Island HISPANIOLA", which describes specific acts of violence by Spanish soldiers against indigenous peoples of the Americas.

Personnel 
Patrick Dubar – vocals
Spike Xavier – vocals
DJ Hall of Records – scratches (tracks: 3, 4, 7, 8, 9, 12)
Robert Adams – scratches (tracks: 2, 5)
Brad Xavier – producer, executive producer
Mike Kumagai – producer, mixing (tracks: 1, 3, 4, 7, 9, 12, 13), engineering
Phil Kaffel – mixing (tracks: 2, 5, 6, 8, 10, 11)
Tom Baker – mastering
Kevin Zinger – management
Jeff Gilligan – design & art direction
Fabrice Hessens – photography
Jason Timms – photography

References

External links 

2001 debut albums
Corporate Avenger albums
Suburban Noize Records albums